The 1998 Burnley Borough Council election took place on 7 May 1998 to elect members of  Burnley Borough Council in Lancashire, England. One third of the council was up for election and the Labour Party stayed in overall control of the council.

An issue in the election were allegations that there had been misuse of the procedure for allocating council housing. This saw 3 Labour councillors face disciplinary action, with the issue being described as "Burnleygate".

The results saw three seats change hands with each of the Liberal Democrats, Conservatives and Independents gaining one seat from Labour. The result in Lowerhouse ward saw former Labour councillor, Eddie Fisk, hold the seat as an independent. Fisk defeated his nephew Sam Holgate who was the Labour candidate but stopped campaigning due to ill health and then resigned from the party as well.

After the election, the composition of the council was:
Labour 31
Liberal Democrat 9
Independent 6
Conservative 2

Election result

Ward results

References

1998 English local elections
1998
1990s in Lancashire